Eustache Fontana, O.P. (died 1611) was a Roman Catholic prelate who served as Bishop of Andros (1602–1611).

Biography
Eustache Fontana was ordained a priest in the Order of Preachers. On 12 August 1602, he was appointed during the papacy of Pope Clement VIII as Bishop of Andros. On 18 August 1602, he was consecrated bishop by Girolamo Bernerio, Bishop of Ascoli Piceno, with Aurelio Novarini, Bishop of San Marco, and Agostino Quinzio, Bishop of Korčula, serving as co-consecrators. He served as Bishop of Andros until his death in 1611.

References 

17th-century Roman Catholic bishops in the Republic of Venice
Bishops appointed by Pope Clement VIII
1611 deaths
Dominican bishops